Road 12 is a road in northern Iran south of Aras River connecting Bazargan to Poldasht, Jolfa, Parsabad and Bileh Savar. The road has strategic importance for the Republic of Azerbaijan, since it is the shortest land-based link connecting Azerbaijan-proper to Nakhjavan via Bileh Savar-Julfa section.

References

Roads in Iran